Reginald Wright (17 January 1901 – 1973) was an English footballer who played in the Football League for Blackpool, Bournemouth & Boscombe Athletic and Chesterfield.

References

1901 births
1973 deaths
English footballers
Association football defenders
English Football League players
Sheffield Wednesday F.C. players
Worksop Town F.C. players
Blackpool F.C. players
AFC Bournemouth players
Chesterfield F.C. players
Frickley Athletic F.C. players
Buxton F.C. players